Bangor station is a train station in Bangor, Michigan, serving Amtrak's Pere Marquette line. The station, originally built in 1926 by the Pere Marquette Railway, was renovated in 2005, and includes an enclosed waiting area, washrooms, a coffee shop, free parking, and payphones. It serves northern Van Buren County and the South Haven area.

History
The brick Bangor station house was built in 1926 by the Pere Marquette Railway, replacing an 1870 wooden station that burned.

Amtrak shared the station with a toy train manufacturer from 1984 (when Amtrak service began) to 1991, when the manufacturer ceased production.  The station was in declining condition, and Amtrak vacated it in favor of a smaller adjacent structure.

In November 2001, the City of Bangor purchased the station from CSX Transportation to prevent it from demolition.  In 2004, they sold it to a health care provider, who doubled the floor space of the building by expanding the attic (once used as a sleeping space for railroaders) into a second floor.  The city still owned the south portico, and they enclosed it as a waiting room.

In July, the Michigan Department of Transportation awarded a $125,000 grant to the city and Amtrak to rebuild the waiting room and railway platform (owned by Amtrak).  After floor, windows, doors, and washrooms were replaced and the benches were refinished, the station was fully reopened to trains on May 6, 2005.

The portico is now the waiting room, the waiting room is now a coffee shop, and the freight agent office and freight room are now space for the health care provider.

References

External links

Amtrak Michigan Services
Michigan Passenger Stations
City of Bangor

Amtrak Stations Database
Amtrak Photo Archive Station 1991-2005, 1926 station exterior before renovation, Waiting room before renovation with original benches

Amtrak stations in Michigan
Former Pere Marquette Railway stations
Railway stations in the United States opened in 1926
Buildings and structures in Van Buren County, Michigan
Transportation in Van Buren County, Michigan
Stations along Chesapeake and Ohio Railway lines